A Brand New Night is the third album by Canadian singer/songwriters The Cash Brothers, released in 2003 on Zoe/Rounder Records. The album features both acoustic and electric guitar work and ballads with vocal harmonies.  While continuing to include the country and folk influences of their previous work, this album is oriented more toward pop music.  All of the tracks were written by one or the other of the brothers.

Critical response
Reviews of the album praised the duo's harmonies, guitar work and songwriting, but some deemed the album somewhat lacking in new melodic content and innovation compared to previous releases.

Track listing

References

2003 albums
The Cash Brothers albums